The United States Open Tennis Championships is a hardcourt tennis tournament held annually at Flushing Meadows, starting on the last Monday in August and lasting for two weeks. The tournament consists of five main championship events: men's and women's singles, men's and women's doubles, and mixed doubles, with additional tournaments for seniors, juniors, and wheelchair players.

In 2006, the boys' singles event was won by Dušan Lojda of the Czech Republic who beat Peter Polansky of Canada, 7–6(4), 6–3 in the final.

Seeds

Draw

Final eight

Top half

Section 1

Section 2

Bottom half

Section 3

Section 4

Boys' Singles
US Open, 2006 Boys' Singles

de:US Open 2006#Einzel Junioren